Filthy Gorgeous: The Bob Guccione Story is a Canadian biographical documentary film which is a biography of Penthouse magazine founder Bob Guccione.

Synopsis
The documentary describes Guccione's life from his schooling and early career through the development of his publishing empire (Penthouse, Omni, Spin). Interview subjects include former Penthouse editor Lynn Barber and Guccione's sons.

Cast - Interviewees
 Patrice Adcroft (Herself) - former editor of Omni magazine
 Audrey Arnold (Herself)
 Peter Bloch (Himself) - writer
 Joe Brooks (Himself) - writer
 Len Carney (Himself)
 Divina Celeste (Herself) - 1982 February Pet of the Month
 Richard Crouse (Himself) - writer
 Dana DeArmond (Herself) - Adult film actress
 Alan M. Dershowitz (Himself) - lawyer and confidante to Guccione
 Al Goldstein (Himself) - Publisher, Screw magazine
 Leslie Jay Gould (Herself) - writer
 Bob Guccione Jr. (Himself) - eldest son of Guccione and founder of music magazine Spin.
 Nick Guccione (Himself) - youngest son of Guccione
 Anthony Haden-Guest (Himself) - writer
 Xaviera Hollander (Herself) - writer and Penthouse columnist
 Jane Homlish (Herself) - Guccione's personal assistant for over 30 years
 Victoria Johnson (Herself) - model,actress, 1977 Penthouse Pet of the Year and former lover of Guccione.
 Victor Kovner (Himself) - attorney
 George Lois (Himself) - designer, author

Release
The film premiered at the Toronto International Film Festival on 9 September 2013.

The documentary was broadcast in Canada on The Movie Network and Movie Central and in the United States on Epix in November 2013.

References

External links
 

2013 films
2010s biographical films
Canadian biographical films
Documentary films about mass media owners
English-language Canadian films
Films about adult magazine publishers (people)
Canadian documentary films
2010s English-language films
2010s Canadian films
Films directed by Barry Avrich